Battle Riot III was a professional wrestling event produced by Major League Wrestling (MLW) that took place on July 10, 2021, at the 2300 Arena in Philadelphia, Pennsylvania. It was MLW's first event since its hiatus due to the COVID-19 pandemic to feature live ticketed fans, the last being the MLW vs AAA Super Series in 2020. It was the third event under the Battle Riot chronology.

The event featured matches that would be taped for future MLW programming; the main card aired on July 24, 2021, on beIN Sports USA and MLW's YouTube channel, while the undercard would air as part of the mini-series, MLW Fusion: Alpha, which premiered on September 22, 2021, on YouTube.

Storylines
The show featured twelve professional wrestling matches that resulted from scripted storylines, where wrestlers portrayed villains, heroes, or less distinguishable characters in the scripted events that built tension and culminated in a wrestling match or series of matches.

Several names announced to participate in the Battle Riot were Alexander Hammerstone, King Muertes, Richard Holliday, Zenshi, Lee Moriarty, TJP, Gringo Loco, Arez, Kevin Ku, Mads Krügger, Myron Reed, Gino Medina, Calvin Tankman, Savio Vega, E. J. Nduka, Aramís, Marshall Von Erich, Ross Von Erich, King Mo, Bu Ku Dao, Alex Kane, Davey Richards, Daivari, Kit Osbourne, Josef Samael, Simon Gotch, Ikuro Kwon, Tom Lawlor, KC Navarro and Jordan Oliver.

Event
Before the match, Azteca Underground owner Cesar Duran made his first appearance in an MLW ring and announced he was MLW's new matchmaker. He was then interrupted by Myron Reed and Jordan Oliver of Injustice, who demanded a match for the MLW World Tag Team Championship. They were in-turn interrupted by Konnan and a new incarnation of The Latin American Xchange (now composed of Slice Boogie, Rivera (formally known as Danny Limelight) and Dr. Julius Smokes), later to be known as 5150, and the two teams would get into a brawl.

Results

Battle Riot match entrances and eliminations

(*) - LAX were already eliminated when they pulled Injustice off the ring apron

(**) - Lawlor disguised himself as L. A. Park to reenter the match

(***) - Two of Contra's Sentai Death Squad members entered

See also
2021 in professional wrestling

References

External links
Battle Riot III official website

2021 in professional wrestling
Battle Riot
Professional wrestling in Philadelphia
2021 in Philadelphia
July 2021 sports events in the United States
Events in Philadelphia